Lysimachus of Alexandria (1st century BCE) was an Egyptian grammarian. According to Josephus in Against Apion (Book I, Chapter 34) he followed criticism of the traditional Jewish record of Moses and the Exodus found in the works of Manetho and Chaeremon of Alexandria.

References

Ancient Alexandrians
1st-century BC African people
Ancient linguists
Linguists from Egypt